is a Japanese politician who has been the leader of the Constitutional Democratic Party of Japan (CDP or CDPJ) since 30 November 2021. He is also a member of the House of Representatives in the Diet (national legislature), currently for the Kyoto 3rd district. 

A native of Sapporo and graduate of Ritsumeikan University, he was elected to the House of Representatives for the first time in 2003 after an unsuccessful run in 2000.

Izumi was originally a member of the Democratic Party of Japan. He later served as Diet affairs chief of Kibō no Tō. He also adhered to the Democratic Party for the People until 2020, when he joined the Constitutional Democratic Party.

Izumi was elected as the leader of the CDP in the 2021 Constitutional Democratic Party of Japan leadership election on 30 November 2021.

Political views 
Izumi has been described as centrist and conservative.

Views on constitutional amendments 
While opposing reforming Article 9 of the Constitution of Japan, he is not against constitutional revision per se. With regards to national security, he rejects the adoption of nuclear weapons and enemy base strike capabilities.

Historical revisionism 
On January 4, 2023, Izumi visited Ise Grand Shrine on the same day as Prime Minister Fumio Kishida and DPP leader Yūichirō Tamaki. Some liberals, progressives and Christians in Japan criticized them for affirming historical colonialism and trying to revive militarism. However, unlike right-wing Japanese nationalist politicians, he refuses to visit Yasukuni shrine.

When the South Korean president Yoon Suk-yeol visited Japan on March 17, 2023. CDP leader Izumi, who asked Yoon about the Statue of Peace issue. The Statue of Peace is a symbol promoted by the South Korean government and South Korean civic groups to various countries to honor the victims of Comfort women. The CDP insists on removing the Statue of Peace.

Cultural liberalism 
Izumi favours same-sex marriage and an LGBT equality law. He also supports reducing dependency on nuclear energy and welcoming greater quotas of foreign workers. He endorses the possibility for women to ascend to the Imperial Throne.

References

External links 
  in Japanese.

1974 births
Centrism in Asia
Constitutional Democratic Party of Japan politicians
21st-century Japanese politicians
Democratic Party of Japan politicians
Historical revisionism of Comfort women
Kibō no Tō politicians
Living people
Members of the House of Representatives (Japan)
National liberalism
People from Sapporo
Ritsumeikan University alumni